Josef Schuetz (German: Schütz, born 16 November 1920) known in the German press as Josef S., is a Lithuanian-born German former Nazi concentration camp guard who was stationed at the Sachsenhausen concentration camp. In June 2022, at the age of 101, Schuetz was handed a five year sentence after a criminal trial for complicity in war crimes during the Holocaust during World War II, becoming the oldest person tried and convicted for Nazi war crimes in Germany.

Biography
Josef Schütz was born in Lithuania on 16 November 1920. By 1942, he was working in the Sachsenhausen concentration camp where one of his duties was being stationed in the watchtower. During Schuetz's tenure at the camp, there were three camp commandants under whom Schuetz worked: Hans Loritz (1942), Albert Sauer (1942–1943), and Anton Kaindl (1943–1945). Schuetz remained at the camp until the end of the war in 1945. After the war, he was released as a prisoner of war in 1947, after which he moved to East Germany where he worked as a locksmith. He was at one point married, but in 1986 became a widower. By 2021, he lived in the northeast state of Brandenburg, Germany.

Trial and conviction
The trial opened on 7 October 2021, when Schuetz was 100, in the Neuruppin Regional Court in Brandenburg, during which he was charged with 3,518 counts of being an accessory to murder. The 17 co-plaintiffs were represented by Thomas Walther, who had previously won a conviction against former Ukrainian-American Waffen-SS guard John Demjanjuk a decade earlier in 2011. Schuetz was represented by  Stefan Waterkamp. While Schuetz has been identified internationally, during and after the trial he is known in Germany only by his first name and last initial due to that country's privacy laws. He pleaded not guilty.

During the trial, Schuetz stated he did "absolutely nothing" wrong and was not aware of the atrocities happening at Sachsenhausen. Instead, he stated he worked as a "farm laborer near Pasewalk in northeastern Germany during the period in question", a claim which the court rejected. The court used historical documents to prove he worked at the camp and was a non-commissioned officer in the Waffen-SS. Testimonies of survivors were also heard, including from Leon Schwarzbaum, who showed a picture of his family who had died in the camp. Schuetz was sentenced to five years in prison for the crimes; when he arrived in court in a wheelchair to hear the verdict on June 28, 2022, he hid his face from the press with a folder to avoid being recognized. During the verdict reading, Judge Udo Lechtermann stated, "You willingly supported this mass extermination with your activity." The timeframe for appeal is within one week of the verdict.

He is the oldest person to be tried and convicted for Nazi-era war crimes in Germany. Because of Schuetz's health and advanced age, he is unlikely to serve any prison time.

References

1920 births
Living people
Lithuanian centenarians
Lithuanian expatriates in Germany
Lithuanian collaborators with Nazi Germany
Lithuanian prisoners of war
German centenarians
German prisoners of war
Locksmiths
Nazis convicted of war crimes
Sachsenhausen concentration camp personnel
Place of birth missing (living people)